King for a Day is a 1940 animated short film featuring Gabby released by Paramount Pictures in the Max Fleischer Cartoon series. The cartoon was released on October 18, 1940. It was the first entry of the Gabby series, the spin-off cartoon series of Gulliver's Travels.

Plot
King Little has received a letter which says "Dear Majesty, please be at home today. I have orders to shoot you. Sincerely yours." He asks Gabby if he would like to be king for a day and Gabby accepts, not knowing that he may be in danger.

References

External links

1940 animated films
1940 short films
Paramount Pictures short films
American comedy short films
1940s American animated films
Fleischer Studios short films
Short films directed by Dave Fleischer
American animated short films
Films about kings
Film spin-offs